Sola Church is a parish church of the Church of Norway in Sola Municipality in Rogaland county, Norway. It is located in the village of Solakrossen. It is the church for the Sola parish which is part of the Tungenes prosti (deanery) in the Diocese of Stavanger. The gray concrete church was built in a rectangular design in 2020 using designs by the architectural firm Brandsbergs-Dahl Arkitekter. The church seats about 300 people.

The church was built to replace the Old Sola Church as the main church for the parish. The old church was located outside of the village on the other side of the airport.

See also
List of churches in Rogaland

References

Sola, Norway
Churches in Rogaland
21st-century Church of Norway church buildings
Churches completed in 2020
2020 establishments in Norway